(French and archaic Dutch) or  (contemporary Dutch) is one of the 19 municipalities of the Brussels-Capital Region, Belgium. Located in the north-eastern part of the region, it is bordered by the City of Brussels, Etterbeek, Evere and Saint-Josse-ten-Noode. In common with all of Brussels' municipalities, it is legally bilingual (French–Dutch).

Schaerbeek has a multicultural identity stemming from its diverse population. , the municipality had a population of 130,690 inhabitants.

Toponymy

Etymology
The first mention of Schaerbeek's name was Scarenbecca, recorded in a document from the Bishop of Cambrai in 1120.

Schaerbeek is nicknamed "the city of donkeys". This name is reminiscent of times when people of Schaerbeek, who were cultivators of sour cherries primarily for Kriek production, would arrive at the Brussels marketplace with donkeys laden with sour cherries. Donkeys are still kept in Josaphat Park, and sour cherry trees line the streets of the Diamant Quarter of Schaerbeek (the /, the /, and the /). The / is named after these trees.

History

Antiquity and Middle Ages
The period at which human activity started in Schaerbeek can be inferred from the Stone Age flint tools that were recovered in the Josaphat valley. Tombs and coins dating from the reign of Roman Emperor Hadrian (2nd century AD) were also found near the old Roman roads that crossed Schaerbeek's territory.

The first mention of the town's name appears in a legal document dated 1120, whereby the Bishop of Cambrai granted the administration of the churches of Scarenbecca and Everna (today's neighbouring Evere) to the canons of Soignies, located in modern-day Hainaut, Belgium. Politically, the town was part of the Duchy of Brabant. In 1301, John II, Duke of Brabant, had the town administered by the schepen (aldermen) of Brussels. A new church dedicated to Saint Servatius was built around that same time, at the same location as the old church.

At the end of the 14th century, the lands of Schaerbeek that belonged to the Lords of Kraainem were sold and reconverted into a hunting ground. The official entry of the visiting Dukes of Burgundy into Brussels, their second capital, was also through Schaerbeek, where they had to swear to uphold the city's privileges. The game reservation and the rural character of the village lasted until the end of the 18th century. The areas not covered by woods were used to cultivate vegetables and grow vines. In 1540, Schaerbeek counted 112 houses and 600 inhabitants.

16th–19th centuries

Until the 16th century, the village had lived in relative peace. This would change in the middle of the 16th century as the Reformation set in. Schaerbeek suffered through ravages and destruction about a dozen times over the following two centuries, starting in the 1570s with William the Silent's mercenary troops fighting the Catholic Duke of Alba. Spanish, French, British, and Bavarian troops all came through Schaerbeek, with the usual exactions and requisitions inflicted on the population.

After the French Revolution, it was decreed that Schaerbeek would be taken away from Brussels and proclaimed an independent municipality, with its own mayor, schepen, and municipal assembly. On 27 September 1830, during the Belgian Revolution, some fighting occurred in the Josaphat valley between the revolutionary troops and the retreating Dutch troops. In 1879, a more modern Church of St. Servatius was built near the old one, which was eventually demolished in 1905. The Municipal Hall and Schaerbeek railway station were built in 1887 and 1902, respectively. In 1889, the shooting range known as the Tir national was established.

At the end of the 19th and in the early 20th centuries, Schaerbeek became home to the gentry. The / was laid out to herald a new, tree-filled residential district for the city's burgeoning middle classes, many of whom employed the period's best architects to design their new homes.

20th and 21st centuries

At the turn of the 20th century, Schaerbeek was a booming suburb which attracted a large middle-class population. In 1904, the newly landscaped Josaphat Park was inaugurated. One year later, the old St. Servatius' Church, the last witness to Schaerbeek's medieval past, was demolished. In 1915, the British nurse Edith Cavell was executed by an occupying German Army firing squad at the Tir national. Dwight D. Eisenhower came to visit the municipality at the close of World War II. Five years later, the population of Schaerbeek peaked at 125,000 inhabitants.

2016 terrorist attacks

On the morning of 22 March 2016, three coordinated bombings occurred in Belgium in which the Islamic State of Iraq and the Levant (ISIL) claimed responsibility. In these attacks, at least 31 victims and two suicide bombers were killed, and 300 other people were injured. Hours after the attacks, police were pointed to a home in Schaerbeek by the taxi driver who drove the suspects to Brussels Airport. They raided the home and found a nail bomb,  of acetone peroxide, hydrogen peroxide, and an ISIL flag. Inside a waste container near the house, they also found a computer belonging to Ibrahim El Bakraoui who is believed to have carried out suicide bombings during the attacks along with his brother.

Nearly seven months later, on 5 October, three police officers were attacked by a man with a camping knife in Schaerbeek. Two of them suffered stab wounds, while the third was physically assaulted but otherwise uninjured. The assailant was then shot in the leg, subdued, and taken to hospital for medical treatment. He was charged with attempted terrorism-related murder but the court did not see these charges proven. He was convicted to a nine-year prison sentence for assault and battery.

Districts
There are two distinct parts of Schaerbeek; an eastern part and a western part. The eastern part (the area that includes the /, the /, the Fleurs Quarter, the /, the Diamant Quarter and Josaphat Park) is an affluent area noted for its architecture and its convenient location (close to the EU institutions and the financial heart of the city, as well as NATO's headquarters in the neighbouring municipality of Evere).

The western part (the area near Brussels-North railway station, the / and the Van Praet bridge) is home to Brussels' large Belgian Turkish community. The area around St. Mary's Royal Church is dubbed the "Little Anatolia" because of all the Turkish restaurants and shops on the Chaussée de Haecht. The area is also home to a significant Belgian Moroccan population and other immigrant communities such as Spanish, Congolese, and Asian immigrants. However, the district offers a social blend because of the numerous schools like the Hogeschool Sint-Lukas Brussel, the municipal administrations and the proximity of the Rue Royale/Koningsstraat.

Demographics
Schaerbeek has a large concentration of immigrants from other countries, and their children, including many of Turkish ancestry, a significant part of which originates from Afyon or Emirdağ, Turkey.

, the largest share of Muslims in Schaerbeek are of Moroccan origin, but there are also Albanians and Turks. That year, the mayor of Schaerbeek Bernard Clerfayt (DéFI) argued that the diversity in the foreign population means there is a lack of a ghetto effect, and Molenbeek's then-mayor Françoise Schepmans (MR) stated that the foreigner population in Schaerbeek was more diverse than that of Molenbeek.

, 22% of young people in Schaerbeek are unemployed. The municipality lies in a semi-circle of neighbourhoods in Brussels often referred to as the "poor croissant".

Foreign population
Migrant communities in Schaerbeek with over 1,000 people as of 1 January 2020:

Education
Public communal French-language secondary schools include:
 , a traditional gateway to the Université libre de Bruxelles (ULB)
 Institut communal d'enseignement technique Frans Fischer
 Lycée Emile Max

French-language subsidised religious secondary schools include:
 
 Collège Roi Baudouin
 Institut de la Saint-Famille d'Helmet
 Collège Roi Baudouin Enseignement technique et professionnel
 Institut Technique Cardinal Mercié-Notre-Dame du Sacré-Coeur
 Institut Saint-Dominique
 Institut de la Vierge Fidèle

Koninklijk Atheneum Emmanuel Hiel serves as the public Dutch-language secondary school in Schaerbeek, operated by the Flemish Community.

Sights
 Schaerbeek counts a number of Art Deco and Art Nouveau houses, including the Autrique House, the first house built by Victor Horta in the Brussels area.
 The impressive Municipal Hall was inaugurated by King Leopold II in 1887.
 Josaphat Park, also inaugurated by King Leopold II (in 1904), provides a haven of quiet in the heart of the city. It is bordered by the Brusilia Residence, the tallest residential building in Belgium.
 Schaerbeek railway station, where the new national railway museum of Belgium, Train World, opened in 2015.
 St. Mary's Royal Church, an eclectic Roman Catholic church built between 1845 and 1888, which has been listed as a protected monument since 1976.
 The Clockarium is a clock museum. There is also a beer museum and a mechanical organ museum nearby.

Schaerbeek Cemetery, despite its name, is actually located in Evere.

Politics
The current city council was elected in the October 2018 elections. The current mayor of Schaerbeek is Bernard Clerfayt a member of DéFl, who is in coalition on the municipal council with Ecolo.

2003 election incident
During the Belgian federal election of 18 May 2003, a candidate received 4,096 unexplained extra votes. After an inquiry, the anomaly was attributed to a single-event upset in an electronic voting machine, likely to have been caused by an ionising particle.

Famous inhabitants

 Todor Angelov (1900–1943), Bulgarian member of the Resistance during World War II
 Jacques Brel (1929–1978), singer
 Roger Camille (1936–2006), cartoonist
 Nicolas Colsaerts (b. 1982), European Tour professional golfer
 Claude Coppens (b. 1936), pianist and composer
 Monique de Bissy (1923–2009), French-Belgian member of the Resistance during World War II
 Michel de Ghelderode (1898–1962), avant-garde dramatist, employed at the Municipal Hall from 1923 to 1946
 Andrée de Jongh (1916–2007), member of the Resistance during World War II
 Paul Deschanel (1855–1922), French statesman and President of France
 Daniel Ducarme (1954–2010), politician and Minister-President of the Brussels-Capital Region
 Georges Eekhoud (1854–1927), novelist
 Virginie Efira (b. 1977), actress and television presenter
 Jan Ferguut (1835–1902), novelist
 Emilio Ferrera (b. 1967), football player and coach
 Agustín Goovaerts (b. 1885), architect
 Georges Grun (b. 1962), former football player
  (1875–1947), Art Nouveau architect
 Jan Cornelis Hofman (1889–1966), Dutch post-impressionist painter, died there.
 Alain Hutchinson (b. 1949), politician and MEP
  (1864–1935), Art Nouveau architect
 Camille Jenatzy (1868–1913), racing driver
 Henry Le Bœuf (1874–1935), banker and patron of the arts
 René Magritte (1898–1967), surrealist painter
 Maurane (1960–2018), singer
 Anca Parghel (1957–2008), Romanian jazz singer, lived on the /.
 Rob Redding (b. 1976), American media proprietor and abstract artist
 Jean Roba (1930–2006), comic book author, creator of Boule et Bill
 François Schuiten (b. 1956), comic book artist
 Roger Somville (b. 1923), painter
 Paul-Henri Spaak (1899–1972), politician, statesman, Prime Minister, and Secretary General of NATO
 Gustave Strauven (1878–1919), Art Nouveau architect
 Raymond van het Groenewoud (b. 1950), musician and singer

International relations

Twin towns and sister cities
Schaerbeek is twinned with:
  Houffalize, Belgium
  Al-Hoceima, Morocco
  Nablus, Palestine
  Beyoğlu, Turkey
  Prairie Village, Kansas, United States
  Dardania, Pristina, Kosovo
  Quebec City, Canada
  Vicovu de Sus, Romania
  Anyang, China

References

Notes

External links

 Official website 
 Local libraries (Evere-Schaerbeek)
 Police zone site – 5344 Polbruno (Evere-Saint-Josse-Schaerbeek)

 
Municipalities of the Brussels-Capital Region
Populated places in Belgium
Turkish diaspora in Europe